USS Bass (SF-5/SS-164), a Barracuda-class submarine and one of the "V-boats", was the first ship of the United States Navy to be named for the bass.

Construction and commissioning
Bass′s keel was laid at the Portsmouth Navy Yard. She was launched as V-2 (SF-5) on 27 December 1924 sponsored by Mrs. Douglas E. Dismukes, wife of Captain Dismukes, and commissioned on 26 September 1925. Like her sisters, Bass was designed to meet the fleet submarine requirement of  surface speed for operating with contemporary battleships.

Engineering

V-2 was completed with two Busch-Sulzer direct-drive 6-cylinder 2-cycle main diesel engines of  each, along with two Busch-Sulzer auxiliary diesel engines of  each, driving electrical generators. The latter were primarily for charging batteries, but to reach maximum surfaced speed, they could augment the mechanically coupled main-propulsion engines by driving the 1,200 hp (890 kW) electric motors in parallel via an electric transmission. Although it wasn't until about 1939 that its problems were solved, electric transmission in a pure diesel-electric arrangement became the propulsion system for the successful fleet submarines of World War II, the Tambor-class through the Tench-class. Prior to recommissioning in 1940, the auxiliary diesels were replaced with two BuEng Maschinenfabrik Augsburg Nürnberg AG (MAN-designed) 6-cylinder 4-cycle diesel engines of  each. In 1942-43 Bass was converted to a cargo submarine, with the main engines removed to provide cargo space, significantly reducing her speed on the remaining auxiliary diesels.

Service history

Inter-War Period
V-2 was assigned to Submarine Division 20 (SubDiv 20) and cruised along the Atlantic coast and in the Caribbean Sea until November 1927, when the Division sailed for San Diego, California, arriving on 3 December 1927. V-2 operated with the fleet on the West Coast, in the Hawaiian Islands, and in the Caribbean Sea until December 1932. During this period her 5 inch (127 mm)/51 caliber deck gun was replaced by a 3 inch (76 mm)/50 caliber weapon.

Renamed Bass on 9 March 1931, she was assigned to SubDiv 12 in April. On 1 July, her hull classification symbol was changed from SF-5 to SS-164. On 2 January 1933, she was assigned to Rotating Reserve SubDiv 15, San Diego. Bass rejoined the fleet again in July and cruised along the West Coast, in the Canal Zone, and in the Hawaiian Islands until January 1937. She then departed the West Coast and arrived at Philadelphia, Pennsylvania on 18 February 1937, where she went out of commission in reserve on 9 June.

World War II
Bass was recommissioned at Portsmouth, New Hampshire on 5 September 1940, and assigned to SubDiv 9, Atlantic Fleet. From February–November 1941, she operated along the New England coast and made two trips to St. George, Bermuda. She arrived at Coco Solo, Canal Zone on 24 November and was on duty there when the Japanese launched their attack on Pearl Harbor.

In 1942, Bass was attached to Submarine Squadron 3 (SubRon 3), SubDiv 31, Atlantic Fleet. From March–August, while based at Coco Solo, she made four war patrols in the Pacific, off Balboa, Panama. While at sea on 17 August 1942, a fire broke out in the after battery room and quickly spread to the aft torpedo room and starboard main electric motor, resulting in the death of 26 enlisted men by asphyxiation. The following day,  arrived to assist the submarine and escorted her into the Gulf of Dulce, Costa Rica. Both then proceeded to Balboa.

Bass remained in the Canal Zone until October 1942, when she departed for Philadelphia, Pennsylvania, arriving on 19 October. Bass was then overhauled at Philadelphia Navy Yard. At this time she was converted to a cargo submarine with the removal of her main engines, severely restricting her speed on the remaining auxiliary engines. Bass proceeded to New London, Connecticut where she conducted secret experiments off Block Island in December 1943. She was again in Philadelphia for repairs from January–March 1944. During the remainder of the year, she was attached to SubRon 1, Atlantic Fleet, and operated out of New London in the area between Long Island and Block Island.

Bass was decommissioned at the Naval Submarine Base New London on 3 March 1945 and expended as a target for the Mark 24 Fido "mine" (actually an acoustic homing torpedo) on 12 March 1945.

References

 Schlesman, Bruce and Roberts, Stephen S., "Register of Ships of the U.S. Navy, 1775–1990: Major Combatants" (Greenwood Press, 1991), 
 Lenton, H. T. American Submarines (Navies of the Second World War) (Doubleday, 1973), 
 Silverstone, Paul H., U.S. Warships of World War II (Ian Allan, 1965), 
 Campbell, John Naval Weapons of World War Two (Naval Institute Press, 1985), 
 Whitman, Edward C.  "The Navy's Variegated V-Class: Out of One, Many?" Undersea Warfare, Fall 2003, Issue 20
 https://web.archive.org/web/20140322093118/http://www.fleetsubmarine.com/sublist.html
 Gardiner, Robert and Chesneau, Roger, Conway's All the World's Fighting Ships 1922–1946, Conway Maritime Press, 1980. .
 Friedman, Norman "US Submarines through 1945: An Illustrated Design History", Naval Institute Press, Annapolis:1995, .
 Navsource.org USS Bass page
 Pigboats.com V-boats page
 DiGiulian, Tony Navweaps.com 5"/51 caliber gun
 DiGiulian, Tony Navweaps.com later 3"/50 caliber gun

External links
On Eternal Patrol: USS Bass
The WRECK HUNTERS Group of wreck divers visiting the wreck.

United States Barracuda-class submarines (1919)
V-boats
Ships built in Kittery, Maine
1924 ships
World War II submarines of the United States
Shipwrecks of the New Jersey coast
Ships sunk as targets
Maritime incidents in March 1945